IX is the third album by an Italian thrash/black metal band Bulldozer, which was released in December 1987. A 12" vinyl by Japanese record label F.O.A.D. Records was released on 9 May 2014 containing an extra slimcase CD included in the gatefold, filled with rare and unreleased photos. This is a sort of a "director’s cut" proposed by the band and totally unreleased until now.

Track listing

All lyrics written by AC Wild

Notes
"Ilona the Very Best" is dedicated to Ilona Staller, a very famous porn star from the mid-1980s
"The Derby" is dedicated to the AC Milan Soccer Club, in which AC Wild is a big fan of

Personnel
Bulldozer
Andy Panigada - guitars
A.C. Wild - vocals, bass, keyboards
Rob "Klister" Cabrini - drums

Production
Nick - engineering
Marco Comerio - cover art
Rob "Klister" Cabrini - cover art
Joseph Carlucci - photography
Ivan - engineering
Luca Passeri - cover art

1987 albums
Bulldozer (band) albums